John  (born 9 July 1956) is an Australian news presenter.

Mangos has previously been a news presenter on Sky News Australia. He has also made cameo appearances on the Australian comedy programs Pizza, Swift and Shift Couriers and Housos.

Career

Television 
 began his career as a journalist for National Nine News in 1978 at the GTV 9 newsroom in Melbourne. He was hired by legendary News Director John Sorrell who wanted to make Mangos the first Greek-Australian face on mainstream commercial television. During his 14 years with the Nine Network he covered State and Federal Politics before becoming the United States correspondent. In 1989, he joined Graham Kennedy on his late night news and current affairs program Coast to Coast, replacing Ken Sutcliffe.

 has also been a news presenter for Eyewitness News on the Ten Network, an international reporter for The Midday Show and the host of his own daytime chat show At Home with John Mangos on the Seven Network for two years.

In 2008, he became a contestant on It Takes Two, a variety show that teams celebrities with professional singers, who each week compete against each other in a sing-off to impress a panel of judges and ultimately the viewing public in order to survive potential elimination.

In June 2011, John Mangos' contract with Sky News was not renewed following controversial comments he made on the Paul Murray Live program. The comments led to a complaint to the Human Rights Commission.

In September 2011, Mangos filled in for Lee Lin Chin on SBS World News for one month.

In December 2011, Mangos joined the Seven Network as a fill in news presenter on Seven Morning News and Seven 4.30 News. He also regularly appeared on Sunrise and The Morning Show.

Other
 lives in Sydney, where he runs his own media consultancy, Megisti Media, which was named after the Greek island of his family's origin, Kastellorizo. He is also Director of Media for international financial corporate relations firm FTI.

Personal life
 is married to Tanny and they have two sons.

References

External links
 , as in 2008, (Wayback Machine)

1956 births
Australian television presenters
Australian people of Greek descent
Journalists from Sydney
Living people
Place of birth missing (living people)